The domestic silk moth (Bombyx mori) is an insect from the moth family Bombycidae. It is the closest relative of Bombyx mandarina, the wild silk moth. The silkworm is the larva or caterpillar of a silk moth. It is an economically important insect, being a primary producer of silk. A silkworm's preferred food are white mulberry leaves, though they may eat other mulberry species and even the osage orange. Domestic silk moths are entirely dependent on humans for reproduction, as a result of millennia of selective breeding. Wild silk moths (other species of Bombyx) are not as commercially viable in the production of silk.

Sericulture, the practice of breeding silkworms for the production of raw silk, has been under way for at least 5,000 years in China, whence it spread to India, Korea, Nepal, Japan, and the West. The domestic silk moth was domesticated from the wild silk moth Bombyx mandarina, which has a range from northern India to northern China, Korea, Japan, and the far eastern regions of Russia. The domestic silk moth derives from Chinese rather than Japanese or Korean stock.

Silk moths were unlikely to have been domestically bred before the Neolithic Age. Before then, the tools to manufacture quantities of silk thread had not been developed. The domesticated B. mori and the wild B. mandarina can still breed and sometimes produce hybrids.

Domestic silk moths are very different from most members in the genus Bombyx; not only have they lost the ability to fly, but their color pigments have also been lost.

Types 
Mulberry silkworms can be divided into three major categories based on seasonal brood frequency. Univoltine silkworms produce only one brood a season, and they are generally found in and around Europe. Univoltine eggs must hibernate through the winter, ultimately cross-fertilizing in spring. Bivoltine varieties are normally found in East Asia, and their accelerated breeding process is made possible by slightly warmer climates. In addition, there are polyvoltine silkworms, only found in the tropics. Their eggs typically hatch within 9 to 12 days, meaning there can be up to eight generations of larvae throughout the year.

Process 

Eggs take about 14 days to hatch into larvae, which eat continuously. They have a preference for white mulberry, having an attraction to the mulberry odorant cis-jasmone. They are not monophagous, since they can eat other species of Morus, as well as some other Moraceae, mostly Osage orange. They are covered with tiny black hairs. When the color of their heads turns darker, it indicates they are about to molt. After molting, the larval phase of the silkworms emerge white, naked, and with little horns on their backs.

After they have molted four times, their bodies become slightly yellow, and the skin becomes tighter. The larvae then prepare to enter the pupal phase of their lifecycle, and enclose themselves in a cocoon made up of raw silk produced by the salivary glands. The final molt from larva to pupa takes place within the cocoon, which provides a vital layer of protection during the vulnerable, almost motionless pupal state. Many other Lepidoptera produce cocoons, but only a few—the Bombycidae, in particular the genus Bombyx, and the Saturniidae, in particular the genus Antheraea—have been exploited for fabric production.

If the animal is allowed to survive after spinning its cocoon and through the pupal phase of its lifecycle, it releases proteolytic enzymes to make a hole in the cocoon so it can emerge as an adult moth. These enzymes are destructive to the silk and can cause the silk fibers to break down from over a mile in length to segments of random length, which seriously reduces the value of the silk threads, although these damaged silk cocoons are still used as "stuffing" available in China and elsewhere for doonas, jackets, etc. To prevent this, silkworm cocoons are boiled. The heat kills the silkworms and the water makes the cocoons easier to unravel. Often, the silkworm itself is eaten.

As the process of harvesting the silk from the cocoon kills the larva, sericulture has been criticized by animal welfare and rights activists. Mahatma Gandhi was critical of silk production based on the Ahimsa philosophy "not to hurt any living thing". This led to Gandhi's promotion of cotton spinning machines, an example of which can be seen at the Gandhi Institute, and an extension of this principle has led to the modern production practice known as Ahimsa silk, which is wild silk (from wild and semiwild silk moths) made from the cocoons of moths that are allowed to emerge before the silk is harvested.

The moth – the adult phase of the lifecycle – is not capable of functional flight, in contrast to the wild B. mandarina and other Bombyx species, whose males fly to meet females and for evasion from predators. Some may emerge with the ability to lift off and stay airborne, but sustained flight cannot be achieved. This is because their bodies are too big and heavy for their small wings. Females are about two to three times bulkier than males (for they are carrying many eggs), but are similarly colored. Adult Bombycidae have reduced mouthparts and do not feed.

Cocoon 

The cocoon is made of a thread of raw silk from 300 to about 900 m (1,000 to 3,000 ft) long. The fibers are very fine and lustrous, about 10 μm (0.0004 in) in diameter. About 2,000 to 3,000 cocoons are required to make 1 pound of silk (0.4 kg). At least 70 million pounds (32 million kg) of raw silk are produced each year, requiring nearly 10 billion cocoons.

Research 

Due to its small size and ease of culture, the silkworm has become a model organism in the study of lepidopteran and arthropod biology. Fundamental findings on pheromones, hormones, brain structures, and physiology have been made with the silkworm. One example of this was the molecular identification of the first known pheromone, bombykol, which required extracts from 500,000 individuals, due to the very small quantities of pheromone produced by any individual silkworm.

Many research works have focused on the genetics of silkworms and the possibility of genetic engineering. Many hundreds of strains are maintained, and over 400 Mendelian mutations have been described. Another source suggests 1,000 inbred domesticated strains are kept worldwide. One useful development for the silk industry is silkworms that can feed on food other than mulberry leaves, including an artificial diet. Research on the genome also raises the possibility of genetically engineering silkworms to produce proteins, including pharmacological drugs, in the place of silk proteins. Bombyx mori females are also one of the few organisms with homologous chromosomes held together only by the synaptonemal complex (and not crossovers) during meiosis.

Kraig Biocraft Laboratories
has used research from the Universities of Wyoming and Notre Dame in a collaborative effort to create a silkworm that is genetically altered to produce spider silk. In September 2010, the effort was announced as successful.

Researchers at Tufts developed scaffolds made of spongy silk that feel and look similar to human tissue. They are implanted during reconstructive surgery to support or restructure damaged ligaments, tendons, and other tissue. They also created implants made of silk and drug compounds which can be implanted under the skin for steady and gradual time release of medications.

Researchers at the MIT Media Lab experimented with silkworms to see what they would weave when left on surfaces with different curvatures. They found that on particularly straight webs of lines, the silkworms would connect neighboring lines with silk, weaving directly onto the given shape. Using this knowledge they built a silk pavilion with 6,500 silkworms over a number of days.

Silkworms have been used in antibiotics discovery, as they have several advantageous traits compared to other invertebrate models. Antibiotics such as lysocin E, a non-ribosomal peptide synthesized by Lysobacter sp. RH2180-5 and GPI0363 are among the notable antibiotics discovered using silkworms.
In addition, antibiotics with appropriate pharmacokinetic parameters were selected that correlated with therapeutic activity in the silkworm infection model.

Silkworms have also been used for the identification of novel virulence factors of pathogenic microorganisms. A first large-scale screening using transposon mutant library of Staphylococcus aureus USA300 strain was performed which identified 8 new genes with roles in full virulence of S. aureus. Another study by the same team of researchers revealed, for the first time, the role of YjbH in virulence and oxidative stress tolerance in vivo.

Domestication 

The domestic species B. mori, compared to the wild species (e.g., B. mandarina), has increased cocoon size, body size, growth rate, and efficiency of its digestion. It has gained tolerance to human presence and handling, and also to living in crowded conditions. The domestic silk moths cannot fly, so the males need human assistance in finding a mate, and it lacks fear of potential predators. The native color pigments have also been lost, so the domestic silk moths are leucistic, since camouflage is not useful when they only live in captivity. These changes have made B. mori entirely dependent upon humans for survival, and it does not exist in the wild. The eggs are kept in incubators to aid in their hatching.

Silkworm breeding 

Silkworms were first domesticated in China more than 5,000 years ago.  Silkworms have since been crossbred to include silk production proteins from spiders to produce silk that is stronger and more elastic.  Since then, the silk production capacity of the species has increased nearly tenfold. The silkworm is one of the few organisms wherein the principles of genetics and breeding were applied to harvest maximum output . It is second only to maize in exploiting the principles of heterosis and crossbreeding.

Silkworm breeding is aimed at the overall improvement of silkworms from a commercial point of view. The major objectives are improving fecundity (the egg-laying capacity of a breed), the health of larvae, quantity of cocoon and silk production, and disease resistance. Healthy larvae lead to a healthy cocoon crop. Health is dependent on factors such as better pupation rate, fewer dead larvae in the mountage, shorter larval duration (this lessens the chance of infection) and bluish-tinged fifth-instar larvae (which are healthier than the reddish-brown ones). Quantity of cocoon and silk produced are directly related to the pupation rate and larval weight. Healthier larvae have greater pupation rates and cocoon weights. Quality of cocoon and silk depends on a number of factors, including genetics.

Hobby raising and school projects 
In the U.S., teachers may sometimes introduce the insect life cycle to their students by raising domestic silk moths in the classroom as a science project. Students have a chance to observe complete life cycles of insects from eggs to larvae to pupae to moths. 

The domestic silk moth has been raised as a hobby in countries such as China, South Africa, Zimbabwe, and Iran. Children often pass on the eggs, creating a non-commercial population. The experience provides children with the opportunity to witness the life cycle of silk moths. The practice of raising silk moths by children as pets has, in non-silk farming South Africa, led to the development of extremely hardy landraces of silk moths, because they are invariably subjected to hardships not encountered by commercially farmed members of the species. However, these worms, not being selectively bred as such, are possibly inferior in silk production and may exhibit other undesirable traits.

Genome 
The full genome of the domestic silk moth was published in 2008 by the International Silkworm Genome Consortium. Draft sequences were published in 2004.

The genome of the domestic silk moth is mid-range with a genome size around 432 megabase pairs.

High genetic variability has been found in domestic lines of silk moths, though this is less than that among wild silk moths (about 83 percent of wild genetic variation). This suggests a single event of domestication, and that it happened over a short period of time, with a large number of wild silkworms having been collected for domestication. Major questions, however, remain unanswered, according to Jun Wang, co-author of a related study published in 2008, who stated: "Whether this event was in a single location or in a short period of time in several locations cannot be deciphered from the data", and research also has yet to identify the area in China where domestication arose.

As food 
 

Silk moth pupae are edible insects and are eaten in some cultures:
 In Assam, India, they are boiled for extracting silk and the boiled pupae are eaten directly with salt or fried with chili pepper or herbs as a snack or dish.
 In Korea, they are boiled and seasoned to make a popular snack food known as beondegi (번데기).
 In China, street vendors sell roasted silk moth pupae.
 In Japan, silkworms are usually served as a tsukudani (佃煮), i.e., boiled in a sweet-sour sauce made with soy sauce and sugar.
 In Thailand, roasted silkworm is often sold at open markets. They are also sold as packaged snacks.

Silkworms have also been proposed for cultivation by astronauts as space food on long-term missions.

Silkworm legends

China 

In China, a legend indicates the discovery of the silkworm's silk was by an ancient empress named Leizu, the wife of the Yellow Emperor, also known as Xi Lingshi. She was drinking tea under a tree when a silk cocoon fell into her tea. As she picked it out and started to wrap the silk thread around her finger, she slowly felt a warm sensation. When the silk ran out, she saw a small larva. In an instant, she realized this caterpillar larva was the source of the silk. She taught this to the people and it became widespread. Many more legends about the silkworm are told.

The Chinese guarded their knowledge of silk, but, according to one story, a Chinese princess given in marriage to a Khotan prince brought to the oasis the secret of silk manufacture, "hiding silkworms in her hair as part of her dowry", probably in the first half of the first century AD. About AD 550, Christian monks are said to have smuggled silkworms, in a hollow stick, out of China and sold the secret to the Byzantine Empire.

Vietnam 
According to a Vietnamese folk tale, silkworms were originally a beautiful housemaid running away from her gruesome masters and living in the mountain, where she was protected by the mountain god. One day, a lecherous god from the heaven came down to Earth to seduce women. When he saw her, he tried to rape her but she was able to escape and hidden by the mountain god. The lecherous god then tried to find and capture her by setting a net trap around the mountain. With the blessing of Guanyin, the girl was able to safely swallow that net into her stomach. Finally, the evil god summons his fellow thunder and rain gods to attack and burn away her clothes, forcing her to hide in a cave. Naked and cold, she spit out the net and used it as a blanket to sleep. The girl died in her sleep, and as she wished to continue to help other people, her soul turned into silkworms.

Silkworm nutrition 
Bombyx mori is essentially monophagous, exclusively eating mulberry leaves (Morus spp.). By developing techniques for using artificial diets, the amino acids needed for development are known. The various amino acids can be classified into five categories: 

Those which, when removed, cause larval development to stop entirely: Lysine, Leucine, Isoleucine, Histidine, Arginine, Valine, Tryptophan, Threonine, Phenylalanine, Methionine
Those which, when removed, impede later stages of larval development: Glutamate and Aspartate
Semi-essential amino acids, with negative effects that can be eliminated by supplementing with other amino acids: Proline (Ornithine can be substituted) 
Non-essential amino acids that can by replaced through biosynthesis by the larvae: Alanine, Glycine, Serine 
Non-essential amino acids that can be removed with no effect at all: Tyrosine

Silkworm diseases 
Beauveria bassiana, a fungus, destroys the entire silkworm body. This fungus usually appears when silkworms are raised under cold conditions with high humidity. This disease is not passed on to the eggs from moths, as the infected silkworms cannot survive to the moth stage. This fungus, however, can spread to other insects.
Grasserie, also known as nuclear polyhedrosis, milky disease, or hanging disease, is caused by infection with the Bombyx mori nucleopolyhedrovirus (aka Bombyx mori nuclear polyhedrosis virus, genus Alphabaculovirus). If grasserie is observed in the chawkie stage, then the chawkie larvae must have been infected while hatching or during chawkie rearing. Infected eggs can be disinfected by cleaning their surfaces prior to hatching. Infections can occur as a result of improper hygiene in the chawkie rearing house. This disease develops faster in early instar rearing.
Pébrine is a disease caused by a parasitic microsporidian, Nosema bombycis. Diseased larvae show slow growth, undersized, pale and flaccid bodies, and poor appetite. Tiny black spots appear on larval integument. Additionally, dead larvae remain rubbery and do not undergo putrefaction after death. N. bombycis kills 100% of silkworms hatched from infected eggs. This disease can be carried over from worms to moths, then to eggs and worms again. This microsporidium comes from the food that the silkworms eat. Female moths pass the disease to the eggs, and 100% of silkworms hatching from the diseased eggs will die in their worm stage. To prevent this disease, it is extremely important to rule out all eggs from infected moths by checking the moth's body fluid under a microscope.
Flacherie infected silkworms look weak and are colored dark brown before they die. The disease destroys the larva's gut and is caused by viruses or poisonous food.
Several diseases caused by a variety of funguses are collectively named Muscardine.

See also 
 Cocoonase
 History of silk
 Silk Road
 List of animals that produce silk
 Samia cynthia
 Thai silk
 Lao silk
 Japanese silk
 List of domesticated animals

References

Further reading

External links 

 Student page on silkworm
 WormSpit, a site about silkworms, silk moths, and silk
 Information about silkworms for classroom teachers with many photos
 SilkBase Silkworm full length cDNA Database
 Silk worm Life cycle photos
 Silkworm School Science Project Instruction
 Life Cycle Of A Silkworm 1943 article with first photographic study of subject

Moths described in 1758
Bombycidae
Domesticated animals
Edible insects
Moths of Asia
Moths of Japan
Moths of Africa
Moths of North America
Silk
Sericulture
Traditional Chinese medicine
Moths of New Zealand
Insects of Turkey
Taxa named by Carl Linnaeus
Insects in culture
Animal models